Wiesenbronn is a municipality  in the district of Kitzingen in Bavaria in Germany.

Personalities 
 Seligman Baer Bamberger, the "Würzburger Rav" (1807-1878), an important representative of orthodox Judaism, was born in Wiesenbronn in Eichenstraße 1 (Oak street 1). A memorial plaque remembers this famous son of Wiesenbronn.

References

Kitzingen (district)